Battle of the Donets may refer to:

 Battle of the Siverskyi Donets, 2022
 Battle of the Donets or the Third Battle of Kharkov, 1943